Diana Devora Redhouse (26 April 1923 – 19 October 2007) was a British artist, best known as the designer in 1963 of the Amnesty candle, part of Amnesty International's first ever Christmas card, a candle wrapped in barbed wire, chosen because of "its simplicity and the effectiveness of its symbolism".

Background
Redhouse was born in London to Jewish parents of Polish/Russian origin, and educated at a local convent school which only had two or three Jewish girls. She left school at 16, and served in the army during the war, who afterwards helped her get a place at St Martins School of Art.

She founded the Hampstead branch of Amnesty International.

She married the architect Alexander Redhouse, who died in 2004, and they had two daughters.

References

External links

1923 births
2007 deaths
20th-century English women artists
Alumni of Saint Martin's School of Art
Artists from London
Jewish women artists